Placa may refer to:

 Placia - a town in ancient Mysia 
 Plaquita, a Dominican bat-and-ball game resembling cricket